Proletarsk is the name of several inhabited localities in Russia.

Urban localities
Proletarsk, Rostov Oblast, a town in Proletarsky District of Rostov Oblast; 

Rural localities
Proletarsk, Bryansk Oblast, a selo in Desyatukhovsky Rural Administrative Okrug of Starodubsky District in Bryansk Oblast;